Uranotaenia (Pseudoficalbia) nivipleura is a species of zoophilic mosquito belonging to the genus Uranotaenia. It is found in India, Sri Lanka, Hong Kong, Australia, China, Indonesia, Laos, Malaysia, Nepal, Singapore, Taiwan, Thailand and Vietnam.

References

External links
Blood meal identification and feeding habits of uranotaenia species collected in the ryukyu archipelago.

nivipleura
Insects described in 1908